Sultan Ahmad was Timurid ruler of Samarkand, 1469–1494.

Sultan Ahmad may also refer to:
Ahmed Tekuder, also known as Sultan Ahmad (reigned 1282–1284), sultan of the Persian-based Ilkhanate
Ahmad (Jalayirids), Jalayirid ruler of Baghdad, 1382–1410
Sultan Ahmad (Guantanamo detainee 842)